Racing White Daring Molenbeek Brussels F.C., often simply referred to as RWDM Brussels, F.C. Brussels or simply Brussels was a Belgian association football club based in the municipality of Molenbeek in the Brussels Capital-Region. They last played in the second division during the 2013–14 season where they finished 8th, but folded at the end of the season due to financial trouble. The club was a continuation of FC Strombeek, a club from the Brussels suburb of Strombeek-Bever with matricule №1936 which was formed in 1932. However, Strombeek merged with Racing White Daring Molenbeek (RWDM) in the 2000s and practising the tradition of RWDM instead. FC Brussels played at the Stade Edmond Machtens, Molenbeek's former stadium. Their highest league ranking was a 10th place in the first division in 2005–06.

History
F.C. Strombeek first registered at the Royal Belgian Football Association in 1932.  After many seasons played at the lower levels of Belgian football, Strombeek first reached the third division by winning the Promotion D – Belgium's 4th highest level of football – in 1995–96. After three seasons at that level, they won the third division A in 1999–2000, gaining promotion to the second division for the first time in their history. They finished at the 10th place in the second division in 2000–01.  The next season, Strombeek finished at the 9th place. At the same time, the club of R.W.D. Molenbeek, though ranked 10th in the first division, were refused their professional license, and were subsequently relegated to the third division, struggling with financial problems.

Johan Vermeersch decicided to create another club by moving KFC Strombeek from the Singelstadion, their stadium in Grimbergen, to Molenbeek's stadium, the Stade Edmond Machtens. KFC Strombeek finished at the 9th place again in the second division in the 2002–03 season. Only 2 players from Strombeek remaining at the club, and the new club was named FC Molenbeek Brussels Strombeek, with the aim to promote to the first division the next season.

In April 2003, the club announced to change the name again. Effectively at the start of 2003–04 season, the club would known as R.W.D.M. Brussels F.C..

They won the 2003–04 Belgian Second Division.

Timeline
RWD Molenbeek had itself been created by the merger of earlier clubs. The timeline below shows visually the history of the various clubs that went into the creation of FC Brussels.

Honours
Belgian Second Division:
Winners: 2003–04
Belgian Third Division A:
Winners: 1999–2000

References

 
Association football clubs established in 1932
1932 establishments in Belgium
Articles which contain graphical timelines
Defunct football clubs in Brussels
Association football clubs disestablished in 2014
2014 disestablishments in Belgium
Molenbeek-Saint-Jean
Belgian Pro League clubs